The Embassy of Luxembourg in London is the diplomatic mission of Luxembourg in the United Kingdom.  It was the home of the Luxembourg government-in-exile during the Second World War.

The building forms one of a group of Grade II listed stucco buildings along the eastern side of Wilton Crescent.

Gallery

References

External links
Official site

Luxembourg
Diplomatic missions of Luxembourg
Luxembourg–United Kingdom relations
Grade II listed buildings in the City of Westminster
Belgravia